Sampson was a Shire horse gelding, foaled in 1846 in Toddington Mills, Bedfordshire, England.

He was later renamed Mammoth.

His peak weight was estimated at

See also
 List of historical horses

References 

1846 animal births
Individual draft horses
Individual male horses
World record holders
Biological records
Horses in the United Kingdom